Richard Plunkett, 2nd Baron of Dunsany (died c. 1482) was an Irish nobleman. He was one of at least five surviving sons of Christopher Plunkett, 1st Baron of Dunsany, and his first wife Anne Fitzgerald, daughter of Richard FitzGerald. He succeeded to the title in 1462.  

He married Joan FitzEustace, daughter of Rowland FitzEustace, 1st Baron Portlester and his first wife Elizabeth Brune; Portlester was a powerful political figure, at various times both Lord Treasurer of Ireland and Lord High Chancellor of Ireland.  Richard Plunkett was alive in 1477 and died around 1482, being succeeded by his son John Plunkett, 3rd Baron of Dunsany. His widow remarried her cousin Sir Maurice FitzEustace.

References

Footnotes

 

15th-century births
1480s deaths
Barons of Dunsany
15th-century Irish people
Year of birth unknown
Year of death uncertain